Sassi Lamouri was the Algerian minister for religious affairs in the 1992 government of Belaid Abdessalam.

References 

Living people
Year of birth missing (living people)
Algerian politicians
21st-century Algerian people